Acteonidae, common name the "barrel bubble snails", is a family of small sea snails, marine gastropod mollusks of the informal group Lower Heterobranchia.

Shell description
The shell is usually smaller than 25 mm. The shell of these sand-dwelling micromollusks is small, but it is large enough to house the retracted soft parts including the entire mantle.

The aperture is elongated. The narrow shell aperture, which is ovate and pointed on the top, can be closed with an operculum.

The thick shell is oviform to fusiform, with a short (sometimes sunken) conical apex. They have spiral sculpturing. The elongated aperture opens up from narrow at the posterior notch to enlarged at the base. The base of the columella has several characteristic plaits.

Anatomy
The radula has no central tooth, and there are five or six laterals on each side. The teeth are very similar in shape and size across the radula, which is specialised for a diet of polychaete worms.

The eggs are enclosed in a long, gelatinous mass, which is attached to the substrate with a short stalk.

The foot is with operculum.

Ecology 
Acteonidae occur in warm seas in shallow and deep water.

Animals predate polychaetes.

Genera
Genera within the family Acteonidae include:

Genus Acteon Montfort, 1810 - type genus

† Genus Acteonina d'Orbigny, 1850

Genus Bathyacteon Valdés, 2008

Genus Callostracon Repetto & Bianco, 2012
 Callostracon amabile Watson, 1886
 Callostracon chariis (Watson, 1886)
 Callostracon tyrrhenicum (Smriglio, C. & P. Mariottini, 1996)
 Distribution : Tyrrhenian Sea.

† Genus Colostracon Hamlin, 1884

Genus Crenilabium Cossmann, 1889
 Crenilabium aciculatum Cossman, 1889
 Crenilabium exile (Jeffreys, 1870)
 Distribution : Florida, Mexico, Eastern Atlantic, Iceland, Mediterranean.
 Length : 8.1 mm
 Description : found at depths of 270 m to 2640 m
 Crenilabium pacifica Kuroda & Habe, 1958
 Distribution : Indo-Pacific

Genus Inopinodon Bouchet, 1975
 Inopinodon azonicus Locard, 1897

Genus Japonactaeon Taki, 1956

Genus Liocarenus Harris & Burrows, 1891
 Liocarenus globulinus Forbes, 1844
 Distribution : Atlantic, Mediterranean

Genus Lissacteon Monterosato, 1890

Genus Maxacteon Rudman, 1971

 Maxacteon cratericulatus Hedley, 1906
 Distribution : New Zealand
 Maxacteon fabreanus (= Acteon fabreanus) Crosse, 1874
 Distribution : Philippines
 Length : 17–30 mm
 Description : white shell with five whorls, each whorl filled with light brown bands covering the many spirals of each whorl.
 Maxacteon flammeus (= Acteon flammeus) Gmelin, 1791
 Distribution : Red Sea, tropical Indo-West Pacific
 Length : 17 mm
 Description : the headshield is developing secondary tentacles.
 Maxacteon hancocki (synonym: Acteon hancocki) Rudman, 1971
 Maxacteon milleri (synonym: Acteon milleri) Rudman, 1971

Genus Mysouffa Marcus, 1974
 Mysouffa cumingii (= Acteon mysouffa cumingii) (A. Adams, 1855)
 Distribution : Florida, Brazil
 Length : 20 mm
 Mysouffa turrita (Watson, 1883)
 Distribution : Jamaica, Cuba, Caribbean
 Length : 14 mm
 Description : found at depths of around 700 m

Genus Neactaeonina Thiele, 1912

Genus Obrussena Iredale, 1930
 Obrussena bracteata Iredale, 1930
 Distribution : Australia
 Obrussena moeshimaensis T. Habe, 1952
 Distribution : Japan

Genus Ongleya Finlay & Marwick, 1937

Genus Ovulacteon Dall, 1889
 Ovulacteon meekii Dall, 1889
 Distribution : Cuba, Bahamas, East Brazil
 Length : 5.5 mm
 Description : found at depths of 360 to 820 m

Genus Pseudacteon Thiele, 1925. There is also a homonym genus Pseudacteon Coquillett, 1907, arthropods in the family Phoridae
 Pseudacteon albus Sowerby III, 1873
 Distribution : South Africa
 Pseudacteon pusillus Forbes, 1844
 Distribution : Florida, North Atlantic, Mediterranean
 Length : 11 mm
 Pseudacteon tenellus Loven, 1846
 Pseudactaeon luteofasciatus (Mühlfeldt, 1829): synonym of Acteon tornatilis (Linnaeus, 1758)
Genus Punctacteon Kuroda & Habe, 1961
 Punctacteon amakusaensis T. Habe, 1949
 Distribution : Indo-Pacific
 Punctacteon cebuanus Lan, 1985
 Distribution : Philippines
 Punctacteon eloisae  Abbott, 1973 Eloise’s acteon
 Distribution : Red Sea, Oman.
 Length : 25–38 mm
 Description: sublittoral on sandy bottoms; cream-colored shell with 5 convex whorls, each whorl with many spiral windings; each whorl is filled with red-brown separate patterns with dark brown to black borders; similar to Maxacteon flammea.
 Punctacteon fabreanus  (H. Crosse, 1874)
 Distribution : Philippines
 Length : 17–30 mm
 Description : white shell with five whorls, each whorl filled with light brown bands covering the many spirals of each whorl.
 Punctacteon kajiyamai T. Habe, 1976
 Distribution : Indo-Pacific
 Punctacteon kawamurai T. Habe, 1952
 Distribution : Japan
 Punctacteon kirai T. Habe, 1949
 Distribution : Indo-Pacific off the Philippines
 Length : 20 mm
 Description : shell whitish to brownish; five whorls, first whorl being the largest; each whorl has many spiral windings; outer lip is notched.
 Punctacteon variegatus (synonym: Acteon variegatus) Bruguière, 1789 Pink-spotted acteon
 Distribution : Philippines, West Australia.
 Length : 9–27 mm
 Description : sublittoral on sandy bottoms; convex, cream-colored shell with five whorls, each whorls is covered with transverse pink-colored to light brown patterns, without dark borders; whirls with prominent shoulder.

Genus Pupa Röding, 1798:

Genus Rictaxis Dall, 1871:

Genus Tenuiacteon Aldrich, 1921
 Tenuiacteon ambiguus Hutton, 1885

Genus Tomlinula Strand, 1932
 Tomlinula turrita Watson, 1886

† Genus Volvaria Lamarck, 1801

Genera brought into synonymy
 Actaeon Ersch & Gruber, 1818: synonym of Acteon Montfort, 1810
 † Actaeonidea Gabb, 1872: synonym of Rictaxis Dall, 1871
 Buccinulus H. Adams & A. Adams, 1854: synonym of Pupa Röding, 1798
 Callostracon sensu Nordsieck, 1972: synonym of † Colostracon Hamlin, 1884 
 Crenilabrum Kobelt, 1892: synonym of Crenilabium Cossmann, 1889
 Dactylus Schumacher, 1817: synonym of  Pupa Röding, 1798
 Japonacteon [sic]: synonym of Japonactaeon Taki, 1956
 Lissactaeon Monterosato, 1890: synonym of Crenilabium Cossmann, 1889
 Neoacteonina [sic] : synonym of Neactaeonina Thiele, 1912
 Obrussa Iredale, 1925: synonym of Obrussena Iredale, 1930
 Solidula Fischer von Waldheim, 1807: synonym of  Pupa Röding, 1798
 Strigopupa Habe, 1958: synonym of  Pupa Röding, 1798
 Tornatella Lamarck, 1816: synonym of Acteon Montfort, 1810

References 
Sources
 Vaught, K.C. (1989). A classification of the living Mollusca. American Malacologists: Melbourne, FL (USA). . XII, 195 pp.
Notes

External links 

 Acteonidae from Sea slugs of Hawaii
  Serge GOFAS, Ángel A. LUQUE, Joan Daniel OLIVER,José TEMPLADO & Alberto SERRA (2021) - The Mollusca of Galicia Bank (NE Atlantic Ocean); European Journal of Taxonomy 785: 1–114